The Confession of Ina Kahr is a 1954 West German crime film directed by G. W. Pabst and starring Curd Jürgens, Elisabeth Müller and Albert Lieven. It was shot at the Bavaria Studios in Munich and on location in Grünwald and Feldafing  The film's sets were designed by the art director Hertha Hareiter and Otto Pischinger.

Cast
 Curd Jürgens as Paul Kahr
 Elisabeth Müller as Ina Kahr
 Albert Lieven as Dr. Pleyer
 Vera Molnar as Jenny
 Friedrich Domin as Vater Stoll
 Jester Naefe as Cora Brink
 Hanna Rucker as Helga Barnholm
 Margot Trooger as Margit Kahr
 Ingmar Zeisberg as Marianne von Degenhardt
 Hilde Körber as Wärterin Stuckmann
 Johannes Buzalski
 Ulrich Beiger
 Renate Mannhardt
 Ernst Stahl-Nachbaur
 Hilde Sessak

References

Bibliography
 Rentschler, Eric. The Films of G.W. Pabst: An Extraterritorial Cinema. Rutgers University Press, 1990.

External links

1954 films
1954 crime drama films
1950s German-language films
German crime drama films
West German films
German black-and-white films
Films directed by G. W. Pabst
Films based on Austrian novels
1950s German films
Films shot at Bavaria Studios